Gabriel Alexander Mitchell (born 30 December 1951) is an Irish former Fine Gael politician who served as Minister of State for European Affairs from 1994 to 1997 and Lord Mayor of Dublin from 1992 to 1993. He served as a Member of the European Parliament (MEP) for the Dublin constituency from 2004 to 2014 and a Teachta Dála (TD) for the Dublin South-Central constituency from 1981 to 2007.

He was defeated by Enda Kenny in the 2002 Fine Gael leadership election. Mitchell was the Fine Gael candidate at the 2011 presidential election.

Early life
Mitchell was born in Inchicore, Dublin, in 1951. Mitchell's mother, Eileen, was left a widow with nine children whom she supported by working as an office cleaner. He was educated at St. Michael's Congregation of Christian Brothers, Emmet Road Vocational School, Dublin Institute of Technology, College of Commerce, Queen's University Belfast and the University of Nottingham. Since leaving politics Mitchell gained a degree and masters from The Priory Institute. His brother, Jim Mitchell, was a long-serving Fine Gael TD and Minister.

Political career
He first held political office in 1979 as a member of Dublin City Council. He was first elected to Dáil Éireann as a Fine Gael TD in the 1981 general election for the Dublin South-Central constituency. Since then he has served as a Minister of State at the Department of the Taoiseach and the Department of Foreign Affairs with special responsibility for European Affairs. He was the Irish Representative on the Reflection Group which prepared the Amsterdam Treaty.

Mitchell also served as Lord Mayor of Dublin from 1992 to 1993. While never holding full cabinet rank, has served on the opposition front bench as Spokesperson for Health from 2000 to 2002, Foreign Affairs 1997 to 2000, Justice from 1993 to 1994, Public Service and Constitutional Reform from 1991 to 1992, Tourism and Transport from 1989 to 1991, European Integration from 1988 to 1989, Urban Renewal from 1987 to 1988 and Health Board Reform from 1981 to 1982.

Following Michael Noonan's resignation as Fine Gael leader in 2002, Mitchell was a challenger in the subsequent leadership election, losing out to the victor, Enda Kenny. Before his election to the European Parliament, he had been party Spokesperson for Foreign Affairs, writing the party's "Beyond Neutrality" policy document.

In November 2006, Mitchell announced that he had taken the difficult decision not to contest the 2007 general election and concentrate on his European Parliament seat. Mitchell was a Vice Chair of the ACP–EU Joint Parliamentary Assembly.

During the 2008 referendum on the Treaty of Lisbon, Mitchell was Fine Gael's director of elections for the referendum.

Mitchell is a former member of the European Parliament Committee on Development, the Special Committee on the Financial, Economic and Social Crisis and the delegation to the ACP–EU Joint Parliamentary Assembly. He was also a substitute member of the Committee on Economic and Monetary Affairs and the delegation for relations with the People's Republic of China.

Mitchell is the author of By Dáil Account, the first book published in Ireland on the history and role of the Public Accounts Committee (PAC) and the office of Comptroller and Auditor General. In September 2010, the Brussels-based Parliament Magazine named him "MEP of the Year" having previously nominated him for the award.

In June 2011, Mitchell refused to release details of his expense and allowance claims as a member of the European Parliament.

In March 2013, he said he would not stand at the 2014 European Parliament election.

2011 presidential campaign

In 2011, Mitchell announced his intention to seek the Fine Gael nomination for the Irish presidential election. On 9 July 2011, he was chosen as the Fine Gael candidate at a special convention. He announced on The Late Late Show on 30 September 2011, that he expected his campaign for the presidency would cost €350,000. Mitchell's unsuccessful attempt to bring the Summer Olympic Games to Dublin was also discussed, with the former lord mayor saying he "set up 10 committees" in his attempt to make it happen.

Mitchell launched his presidential campaign with Taoiseach Enda Kenny on 3 October 2011. That same day he was involved in controversy when he made a joke about suicide on Newstalk's The Right Hook programme. He promised to "jump off O'Connell Bridge" if he was asked to smile. Founding Secretary of the Irish Association of Suicidology Dr John Connolly described Mitchell's comment as "unfortunate".

Clemency pleas
Following the initial withdrawal of David Norris from the 2011 presidential campaign, after it was revealed that Norris had sought clemency for his former partner from a statutory rape conviction, it was subsequently pointed out that Mitchell had also sought clemency for a convict, in his case for Army of God member and double-murderer Paul Jennings Hill, a fact that had been public knowledge for eight years.

On 22 March 2002, Amina Lawal was sentenced to death by stoning for adultery and for conceiving a child out of wedlock, as chair of the Oireachtas European Affairs Committee, Mitchell met with the Nigerian ambassador to Ireland to protest the sentence at the time.

Another convict Mitchell sought clemency for was Louis Truesdale, who was convicted in 1980, of the rape and murder of 18-year-old Rebecca Ann Eudy. The victim's mother, Evelyn Eudy said that she "was appalled to hear Mr Mitchell was running as a presidential candidate in Ireland". According to newspaper reports when he was questioned about these letters on 27 August 2011, he "became quite incensed" and revealed that he has written "a number" of clemency pleas.

Views on homosexuality
When asked for his views on same-sex marriage in a radio interview with Pat Kenny on 12 August 2011, Mitchell said he did not want to do anything that "weakens marriage" but that he had supported civil unions. In 2004, Mitchell defended Italian MEP Rocco Buttiglione's remarks when he referred to homosexuality as a sin.

Mitchell has been questioned as to whether or not he is a member of the European Catholic group Dignitatis Humanae Institute, which he denied on the same radio interview with Pat Kenny, However, according to Benjamin Harnwell, the institute's founding chairman Mitchell helped formulate the charter that became the institute's Universal Declaration of Human Dignity. In the same interview Mitchell was also asked whether or not he is a member of the Iona Institute (who reject the notion of same-sex marriages), which he also denied, however in September 2007, he did host a conference (The Fragmenting Family) on behalf of the Iona Institute.

In popular culture
Michael McDowell, contrasting Gay Mitchell to his brother Jim in a humorous wordplay on the principle of "the lesser of two evils", once jokingly referred to Gay as "the evil of two lessers".

See also
Families in the Oireachtas

References

External links

|-

1951 births
Living people
Alumni of Dublin Institute of Technology
Alumni of Queen's University Belfast
Alumni of Institute of Technology, Tallaght
Alumni of the University of Nottingham
Candidates for President of Ireland
Fine Gael MEPs
Fine Gael TDs
Lord Mayors of Dublin
Members of the 22nd Dáil
Members of the 23rd Dáil
Members of the 24th Dáil
Members of the 25th Dáil
Members of the 26th Dáil
Members of the 27th Dáil
Members of the 28th Dáil
Members of the 29th Dáil
MEPs for the Republic of Ireland 2009–2014
MEPs for the Republic of Ireland 2004–2009
Ministers of State of the 27th Dáil